Andreas Chronis (born 25 April 1989 in Bayside, Queens, New York) is a Greek-American professional soccer player who currently plays for semi-professional club New York Pancyprian Freedom.

Career

AEK Athens and Nea Ionia
After graduating from Holy Cross High School in 2007, Chronis was set to attend and play for Columbia University, but instead signed a four-and-a-half-year contract with Greek Super League club AEK Athens.  Upon joining AEK, the club loaned Chronis to Delta Ethniki club Nea Ionia for two consecutive seasons, where Chronis made a total of 57 appearances and scored 11 goals.

Agia Paraskevi and Panachaiki
During the summer transfer period of 2009, Chronis had an unsuccessful trial with English third division side Brighton before Football League club Agia Paraskevi acquired Chronis from AEK.  Chronis made an immediate impact at Agia Paraskevi, and his performances were impressive enough that promotion contenders Panachaiki would buy him during the winter transfer period.

In 2010–11, Chronis made 11 appearances as Panachaiki earned promotion to the Football League.

In December 2011, the contract between Panachaiki and Chronis was terminated by mutual consent.

International career
Chronis has participated with the United States Under-17 national team and United States Under-18 national team.

References

1989 births
Living people
American people of Greek descent
Holy Cross High School (Flushing) alumni
American soccer players
American expatriate soccer players
People from Bayside, Queens
Sportspeople from Queens, New York
Soccer players from New York City
AEK Athens F.C. players
Panachaiki F.C. players
New York Pancyprian-Freedoms players
Cosmopolitan Soccer League players
Association football wingers
Association football fullbacks